USS Keosanqua may refer to the following ships of the United States Navy:

, a United States Navy sloop-of-war or frigate for which construction plans were cancelled in 1866.
, was a fleet tugboat launched 26 February 1920 and sold 11 July 1947
, was launched 17 January 1945 and transferred to the Republic of Korea on 1 February 1962

United States Navy ship names